Primary Consort Minhui (1609 – 22 October 1641), of the Khorchin Mongol Borjigit clan, personal name Harjol ("Jade" in the Manchu language), was a consort of Hong Taiji. She was 17 years his junior.

Life

Family background
 Father: Jaisang, held the title of a first rank prince
 Paternal grandfather: Manggusi, held the title of a first rank prince
 Paternal aunt: Empress Xiaoduanwen (1599–1649)
 Mother: Boli (d. 1654)
 Four elder brothers
 One younger sister
 Empress Xiaozhuangwen (1613–1688), the mother of the Shunzhi Emperor (1638–1661)

Tiancong era
In 1634, Lady Borjigit travelled to Mukden Palace in present-day Shenyang, Liaoning, in order to become one of Hong Taiji's multiple wives. Their marriage took place on 6 December 1634. Prior to this, the Khorchin Mongols had sent Hong Taiji two other women, Jerjer, the future Empress Xiaoduanwen, and Bumbutai, the future Empress Xiaozhuangwen, on 28 May 1614 and in March or April 1625 respectively, to strengthen the relationship between the Qing dynasty and the Khorchin. Lady Borjigit was 26 years old when she married Hong Taiji, placing her out of the typical age women married during that time period, which was between 13–17 years. There are no documents that conclusively prove why Lady Borjigit did not marry while she was younger, but some claims state that she had previously married a Khorchin warrior, Zhuolin (桌林), and that she married Hong Taiji after her first husband's death.

Chongde era
Lady Borjigit was deeply favoured by Hong Taiji although she did not seem to reciprocate these feelings in the early years of their marriage. Hong Taiji so favoured Lady Borjigit that when he conferred titles on his five primary spouses in August 1636, he named her "Consort Chen" of Guanju Palace (關睢宮) and gave her the position as the head of the concubines, a high ranking position that placed her just below her aunt, the Empress Jerjer. The following year, on 27 August 1637, Lady Borjigit gave birth to Hong Taiji's eighth son, who did not live long and died on 13 March 1638. Lady Borjigit was left in weak health and became seriously ill three years later. Upon hearing the news that Lady Borjigit was on her deathbed, Hong Taiji reportedly left an active battlefield to be by her side. Lady Borjigit died on 22 October 1641 and was interred in the Zhao Mausoleum.  Her death devastated Hong Taiji, who spent much of his time mourning her, to the detriment of his rapidly deteriorating health, and he granted her the posthumous title "primary consort Minhui".

Titles
 During the reign of the Wanli Emperor (r. 1572–1620):
 Lady Borjigit (from 1609)
 During the reign of Hong Taiji (r. 1626–1643):
 Secondary consort (from 6 December 1634)
 Consort Chen (from August 1636), fourth rank consort (same level with the typical Imperial Noble Consort, which ranks second just below the Empress)
 Primary consort Minhui (from November/December 1641)

Issue
 As Consort Chen:
 Hong Taiji's eighth son (27 August 1637 – 13 March 1638)

In fiction and popular culture
 Portrayed by Yuen Yi-ling in The Rise and Fall of Qing Dynasty (1987)
 Portrayed by He Saifei in Xiaozhuang Mishi (2003)
 Portrayed by Chen Jianyue in Da Qing Fengyun (2006)
 Portrayed by Zhang Meng in In Love with Power (2012)
 Portrayed by He Hua in The Legend of Xiao Zhuang (2015)
 Portrayed by Tang Yixin in  Rule the World (2017)

See also
 Ranks of Imperial Consorts in China#Qing
 Qing Dynasty nobility

Notes

References
 

1609 births
1641 deaths
Qing dynasty imperial consorts
Borjigin
17th-century Mongolian women
Consorts of Hong Taiji